The East Village, sometimes called the "East Village Arts District," is the name of a neighborhood in Long Beach, California, within eastern  Downtown Long Beach.  The borders of the East Village are not strictly defined, but the area is centered in the southeast portion of downtown, roughly between Long Beach Boulevard on the west and Alamitos Avenue on the east, and Ocean Boulevard on the south to 10th Street on the north.

The East Village is a mix of many different housing types, including high-rise condos, artist lofts and small craftsman cottages. It serves as the home to individuals with differing cultures, income levels, and professions.

The neighborhood has many independent stores selling everything from designer denim and specialty sneakers to used books and mid-century furniture. There are coffee shops, juice bars, and restaurants featuring selections from crepes and sushi to chicken n' waffles.

The East Village is also the city's arts district, with most of the independent shops, restaurants and galleries exhibiting work by Long Beach and Southern Californian artists.

Appearances in popular culture

 SoundWalk was featured in Visiting... with Huell Howser Episode 1612

Gallery

See also
Broadway Corridor, Long Beach, California
Neighborhoods of Long Beach, California

References

External links 
 Soundwalk (annual sound art festival)
  Second Saturday (monthly art walk)
  Second Saturday MySpace page 

Neighborhoods in Long Beach, California
Tourist attractions in Long Beach, California
Arts districts